Carlos Hernández (born March 8, 1961 in Camagüey, Cuba) is a Cuban-born American politician. Hernández served as the Mayor of Hialeah, Florida, from May 2011 to November 2021. He became acting mayor in 2011 upon the resignation of his predecessor, Julio Robaina, who left the Hialeah mayoral office to pursue an unsuccessful campaign for Mayor of Miami-Dade County.

Hernández was raised in Hialeah, Florida. He received a bachelor's degree in organizational leadership from St. Thomas University in Miami Gardens.

Hernández was elected to the Hialeah city council in November 2005. He was further elected council president in 2007 and again in 2009 by the members of the council. Under the Hialeah city charter, Hernández, who was still council president in 2011, became Mayor of Hialeah upon the resignation of former Mayor Julio Robaina in 2011.

Carlos Hernández won a full term in the 2011 Hialeah mayoral election.

Ethics violation
In July 2015, the Miami-Dade County Ethics Commission made findings that Hernández had lied twice in an October 2011 press conference about high-interest loans of $180,000 to a convicted Ponzi schemer. He was fined $3,000 by the Miami-Dade County Ethics Commission.

On November 7, 2015, Hernández sent 28 buckets filled with pennies and nickels via a truck to pay the fine despite being ordered to pay with a check. The payment was refused and the Commission is now suing him for refusing to pay.

In May 2016, Hernández delivered 145 boxes of coins to a Miami bank that, in turn, transferred the $4,000 to the Miami-Dade County Ethics Commission.

In September 2019 he decided to cut the pay of The City of Hialeah Firefighters by 6% which, on average, is $500 or more per person. He claims that the cut was to raise pensions for other citizens without raising taxes.

References

Further reading
 

1961 births
American politicians of Cuban descent
Florida Republicans
Hispanic and Latino American mayors in Florida
Mayors of Hialeah, Florida
St. Thomas University (Florida) alumni
Living people
21st-century American politicians
Latino conservatism in the United States